Thomas Ian Griffith (born March 18, 1962) is an American actor and martial artist. He is best known for portraying Terry Silver in the 1989 film The Karate Kid Part III, a role he reprised in the fourth and fifth seasons of the television series Cobra Kai.

Early life
Griffith was born in Hartford, Connecticut, the son of Mary Ann (née O'Neil), who worked at a dance studio, and Thomas Joseph Griffith. Griffith attended South Catholic High School in Hartford. He then studied at the College of the Holy Cross where he was a dean's list student before leaving after his junior year to "make it" as an actor in New York.

Career
Griffith became obsessed with Tae Kwon Do while in high school and earned a black belt when he was 18. His knowledge of Tae Kwon Do helped him land his first feature film: 1989's The Karate Kid Part III, in which he played Terry Silver, a rival martial arts expert who influences Daniel LaRusso against his friend and mentor, Mr. Miyagi.

In 1996, Griffith starred in the film Hollow Point alongside Tia Carrere, as DEA agent Max Parish and FBI agent Diane Norwood respectively. Griffith has also collaborated with director John Carpenter. He played head vampire Jan Valek in the 1998 film Vampires and co-created the comic book series Asylum, together with Carpenter and producer Sandy King.

Griffith appeared in the 2002 film XXX, in which he portrayed Agent Jim McGrath.

His first TV role was on the soap opera Another World, as Catlin Ewing, whom he played from 1984 to 1987. In 1999, he starred in the TV movie Secret of Giving with Reba McEntire; earlier in 1999, he had appeared in Reba's video for the song "What Do You Say". He also starred as Rock Hudson in a 1990 TV movie Rock Hudson. He has made guest appearances on a number of television shows, including In the Heat of the Night, Wiseguy, and One Tree Hill.

From 2013 to 2017, Griffith periodically wrote and worked as a story editor for the NBC television series Grimm and became a co-producer in 2015.

In 2021 and 2022, Griffith reprised the role of Terry Silver in the fourth and fifth seasons of Cobra Kai.

Personal life
Griffith has been married to his former Another World costar Mary Page Keller since 1991, and has two sons. He holds a black belt in tae kwon do and kenpo karate.

Filmography

Film
{| class="wikitable"
|- bgcolor="#B0C4DE" align="center"
! Year
! Film
! Role
! Notes
|-
| 1989
| The Karate Kid Part III
| Terry Silver
|
|-
| 1990
| Rock Hudson
| Rock Hudson
| TV movie
|-
| 1992
| Ulterior Motives
| Jack Blaylock
|
|-
| 1992
| Kill Fee
| Unknown
|
|-
| 1993
| Excessive Force
| Detective Terry McCain
|
|-
| 1994
| Crackerjack
| Jack Wild
|
|-
| 1994
| Blood of the Innocent
| Detective Frank Wusharsky
|
|-
| 1996
| Hollow Point
| Max Parrish
|
|-
| 1997
| Behind Enemy Lines
| CIA Agent Mike Weston
|
|-
| 1997
| Kull the Conqueror
| General Taligaro
|
|-
| 1997
| The Guardian
| The Guardian
| TV movie
|-
| 1998
| John Carpenter's Vampires
| Jan Valek
|
|-
| 1999
| The Unexpected Mrs. Pollifax
| Jack Farrell
| TV movie
|-
| 1999
| Avalanche
| Neal Meekin
|
|-
| 1999
| The Secret of Giving
| Harry Withers
| TV movie
|-
| 2000
| A Vision of Murder: The Story of Donielle
| Doug Brister
| TV movie
|-
| 2000
| For the Cause
| Evans
|
|-
| 2001
| High Adventure
| Chris Quatermain
|
|-
| 2002
| Beyond the Prairie: The True Story of Laura Ingalls Wilder
| Cornelius Loudermilk
| TV movie
|-
| 2002
| Black Point
| Gus Travis
|
|-
| 2002
| XXX
| NSA Agent Jim McGrath
|
|-
| 2003
| Timecop 2: The Berlin Decision
| Brandon Miller
|
|-
| 2005
| The Pirate's Curse
| Captain Jeffery Thorpe
|
|-
| 2020
| Dolly Parton's Christmas on the Square
| None
| Consulting Producer
|}

Television

Video GamesCobra Kai 2: Dojos Rising'' (2022) as Terry Silver (voice role)

References

External links
 
 

1962 births
Living people
Male actors from Hartford, Connecticut
Age controversies
American male film actors
American male soap opera actors
American male television actors
American male karateka
American Kenpo practitioners
American male taekwondo practitioners